Orbeanthus is a genus of flowering plants of the family Apocynaceae, first described as a genus in 1978. It is native to South Africa.

Species
 Orbeanthus conjunctus (White & Sloane) L.C. Leach - South Africa
 Orbeanthus hardyi (R.A. Dyer) L.C. Leach - South Africa

References

Apocynaceae genera
Asclepiadoideae
Flora of South Africa